Jérémy Sapina (born 1 February 1985 in Rillieux-la-Pape, Rhône) is a French former footballer who played as a central defender.

References

 
 
 

1985 births
Living people
People from Rillieux-la-Pape
French footballers
AS Nancy Lorraine players
Royal Excel Mouscron players
C.S. Marítimo players
R.A.E.C. Mons players
FC Rapid București players
SR Colmar players
Grenoble Foot 38 players
Louhans-Cuiseaux FC players
Belgian Pro League players
Challenger Pro League players
Liga I players
French expatriate footballers
French expatriate sportspeople in Belgium
Expatriate footballers in Belgium
French expatriate sportspeople in Romania
Expatriate footballers in Romania
Association football defenders
Sportspeople from Lyon Metropolis
Footballers from Auvergne-Rhône-Alpes